Cuba women's national basketball team is administered by the Federación Cubana de Baloncesto.

Achievements

Olympic Games
 1980 – 5th place
 1992 – 4th place
 1996 – 6th place
 2000 – 9th place

Friendship Games
Basketball at the Friendship Games
 1984 –  3rd place

World Championship
 1953 – 10th place
 1957 – 12th place
 1971 – 7th place
 1983 – 10th place
 1986 – 6th place
 1990 –  3rd place
 1994 – 6th place
 1998 – 7th place
 2002 – 9th place
 2006 – 11th place
 2014 – 12th place

FIBA Americas Championship
 1989 –  1st place
 1993 – 4th place
 1995 –  2nd place
 1997 –  3rd place
 1999 –  1st place
 2001 –  2nd place
 2003 –  2nd place
 2005 –  1st place
 2007 –  2nd place
 2009 – 4th place
 2011 – 4th place
 2013 –  1st place
 2017 – 8th place
 2019 – 6th place

Pan American Games
 1967 – 5th place
 1971 –  3rd place
 1975 –  3rd place
 1979 –  1st place
 1983 –  2nd place
 1987 – 4th place
 1991 –  2nd place
 1999 –  1st place
 2003 –  1st place
 2007 –  3rd place

Team

Current roster
Roster for the 2019 FIBA Women's AmeriCup.

Former squads
1980 Olympic Games

Andrea Borrell
Bárbara Becquer
Caridad Despaigne
Inocenta Corvea
María de los Santos

María Moret
Matilde Charro
Nancy Atiez
Santa Margarita Skeet
Sonia de la Paz

Vicenta Salmón
Virginia Pérez
Head coach:—

1990 World championship

Ana Hernández
Beatriz Perdomo
Dalia Henry
Gestrudis Gómez
Yudith Águila

Andrea Borrell
Liset Castillo
María León
Odalys Cala
Olga Vigil

Regla Hernández
Yamilet Martínez
Head coaches:Tomas MartínezManuel Pérez

1992 Olympic Games

Ana Hernández
Andrea Borrell
Biosotis Lagnó
Dalia Henry
Grisel Herrera

Yudith Águila
Liset Castillo
María León
Milayda Enríquez
Olga Vigil

Regla Hernández
Yamilé Martínez
Head coach:—

1994 World championship

Biosotys Lagnó
Dalia Henry
Yudith Águila
Andrea Borrell
Licet Castillo

Lisdeivis Víctores
María León
Milayda Enríquez
Olga Vigil
Regla Hernández

Tania Seino
Yamilé Martínez
Head coach:—

1996 Olympic Games

Tania Seino
María León
Yamilé Martínez
Dalia Henry
Milayda Enríquez

Lisdeivis Víctores
Olga Vigil
Grisel Herrera
Biosotis Lagnó
Yudith Águila

Cariola Hechavarría
Gertrudis Gómez
Head coach:—

1998 World championship

Dalia Henry
Grisel Herrera
Yudith Águila
Licet Castillo
Lisdeivis Víctores

Milayda Enríquez
María León
Taimara Suero
Tania Seino
Yamilé Martínez

Yadiletsy Ríos
Yuliseny Soria
Head coach:—

2000 Olympic Games

Liset Castillo
Milayda Enríquez
Cariola Hechavarría
Dalia Henry
Grisel Herrera

María León
Yamilé Martínez
Yaquelín Plutín
Tania Seino
Yuliseny Soria

Taimara Suero
Lisdeivis Víctores
Head coach:—

2002 World championship

Cariola García
Yudith Águila
Liset Castillo
Zuleira Aties
María León

Milayda Parrado
Milaisis Duanys
Taimara Suero
Yaquelín Plutín
Yamilé Martínez

Yulzeny Soria
Lisdeivis Víctores
Head coach:—

2003 Pan American Games

Yudith Águila
Suchitel Ávila
Yayma Boulet
Ariadna Capiró
Liset Castillo

Milaisis Duanys
Oyanaisis Gelis
Yamilé Martínez
Yaquelín Plutín
Yulianne Rodríguez

Taimara Suero
Lisdeivis Víctores
Head coach:—

2006 World championship

Arlenis Romero
Taimara Suero
Yakelyn Plutin
Oyanaisis Gelis
Leidys Oquendo

Yamara Amargo
Yayma Boulet
Yamilé Martínez
Klavdia Calvo
Yolyseny Soria

Yulianne Rodríguez
Suchitel Ávila
Head coach:—

2007 Pan American Games

Yamara Amargo
Suchitel Ávila
Yayma Boulet
Cariola Hechevarría
Oyanaisis Gelis

Yamilé Martínez
Clenia Noblet
Leidys Oquendo
Yakelín Plutín
Arlenys Romero

Yolyseny Soria
Taimara Suero
Head coach:Alberto Zabala

2008 Olympic Qualifying tournament

Yamara Amargo
Suchitel Avila
Yayma Boulet
Taimy Fernández
Oyanaisis Gelis

 Marlen Cepeda
Clenia Noblet
Leidys Oquendo
Yakelín Plutín
Arlenys Romero

Yolyseny Soria
 Ineidis Casanova
Head coach:Alberto Zabala

See also
Cuba women's national under-19 basketball team
Cuba women's national under-17 basketball team
Cuba women's national 3x3 team

References

External links
FIBA profile
Latinbasket.com – Cuba Women National Team
Cuba Basketball Records at FIBA Archive
Cuba Sport – Basketball

 
Basketball in Cuba
Women's national basketball teams